Simplon is the name of a region in the Alps, and can refer to:
 Simplon Pass
 Simplon Tunnel, close to the pass
 Simplon (département), a former French département corresponding with modern Valais, Switzerland
 Simplon, Valais, a Swiss municipality
 Simplon (Paris Metro), a stop on the Paris Metro
 Simplon, a farm and railway station in Namibia (see :de:Simplon (Namibia))